Zyphe (also spelled Zophei) is a Kuki-Chin language spoken primarily in Thantlang township, Chin State, Myanmar, and also spoken in India. It is spoken by 17,000 Burmese and 3,000 Indians. There are 2 dialects, east Zyphe and west Zyphe.

References

Languages of Myanmar
Languages of Mizoram
Kuki-Chin languages